The Trinci were a noble family from central Italy, who were lords of Foligno, in Umbria, from 1305 to 1439.

History
During the War of the Guelphs and Ghibellines which tore apart Italy from the 12th to the 14th century, the Trinci were initially Guelphs, but switched to the other party from 1240. Corrado (I) and Trincia I Trinci held the title of podestà or vicar of Foligno in the late 13th century. 

In 1305 the Trinci, after returning to the Guelphs, became lords of Foligno by expelling the Ghibelline Anastasi thanks to the support of nobles from Spoleto and Perugia. Nallo governed as capitano del popolo until 1321. After him, the Trinci held the titles of gonfaloniere di giustizia and capitani.

Nallo's brother, Ugolino, ruled until 1338, being succeeded by Nallo's son, Corrado I, who died in 1343. He was followed by Ugolino Novello, the last to hold the aforementioned titles. The first official recognition came in 1367, when Pope Urban V named Ugolino's son, Trincia II Trinci, as apostolic vicar. Trincia was killed in 1377 by some Ghibellin exiles. His brother Corrado II ruled Foligno until 1388, followed by his son Ugolino III, who was a friend of the condottiero Braccio Fortebraccio.

His sons Niccolò, Bartolomeo and Corrado III co-ruled the city from 1415 to 1421. Corrado, however, decided to break with the Papal authority. Assailed by Cardinal Giovanni Maria Vitelleschi, he lost Foligno, which thereafter lost its autonomy and became part of the Papal States.

See also
Palazzo Trinci
Papal States

Sources

External links
 Family history 

 
Italian noble families
Wars of the Guelphs and Ghibellines
Lords of Foligno